The Kayseri Province is situated in central Turkey. The population is 1,434,357 of which around 1,175,876 live in the city of Kayseri. It covers an area of 16,917 km2 and it borders with Sivas, Adana, Niğde, Kahramanmaraş, Yozgat and Nevşehir provinces.

The province is an area that has been linked with mythological stories as well as important figures in Turkish history. It is located in Anatolia, and surrounded by the Mount Erciyes, the Mount Hasan and the Mount Ali. The Ali mountain is named like that in honor of Ali Baba, who is said to have lived in the area. Locals claim that Kayseri is the most peaceful city in the world.

Districts

History

It was the residence of the Cappadocian kings and was sacked by Tigranes I, king of Armenia, in the 1st century BCE.Kayseri was first known as the city of Masaka. Later, during the Roman period, the province's name was changed to Kaesarea, then Kayzer before becoming known with its modern name of Kayseri. Danishmend Gazi conquered Kayseri in 1084. The Seljuk Empire then modernised the province, with new buildings and mosques being built around. During this period, the Şifahane, Kayseri's first hospital, and perhaps the first hospital in all of Anatolia, was built. It was built in honor of Princess Gevher Nesibe Hatun, daughter of the Sultan. She died of a disease at a young age. Construction of the hospital was completed in 1206.

Later on, Kayseri became a cultural mecca of poets, artists in Turkey. Seyyid Burhaneddin lived there, and so did others such as Kadı Burhaneddin and Seyrani, among many others. Seynari was born in 1807. Sinan the Great, an Ottoman architect, was also from Kayseri.

According to Turkish mythology, a man named Hasan Baba would cross mountains during the month of August every year and bring Ali Baba snow, which would not melt.

The province roughly corresponds to ancient Cappadocia.

Modern Kayseri
Kayseri is nowadays a province filled with modern buildings and museums. Some of Turkey's most famous statues and monuments are located there. The modern city of Kayseri is in the Melikgazi district.

Transportation in Kayseri
Apart from taxi and bus transportation, Kayseri has a modern airport, Kayseri International Airport is served by 13 airlines, including Turkish Airlines and it has Kayseray which is the in-city rail system of main public transportation element in Kayseri.

Gallery

Places of Interest
 Erciyes Ski Center
 Tekgöz Bridge, a historic bridge in Kocasinan on the Kızılırmak River
 Beştepeler, a mountain with a stunning view of Kayseri.

References

External links

  Kayseri governor's official website
  Kayseri municipality's official website
  Kayseri weather forecast information
 Pictures of the capital of Kayseri province and its sights
  Large Kayseri History
  Kayseri web tasarım
  Kayseri web tasarımı